Willoughby Hyett Dickinson, 1st Baron Dickinson, KBE, PC (9 April 1859 – 31 May 1943), was a British Liberal Party politician. He was Member of Parliament for St. Pancras North from 1906 to 1918. He was an influential proponent of establishing a League of Nations after WWI.

Background
Dickinson was the son of Sebastian Stewart Dickinson, Member of Parliament for Stroud. He was educated at Eton College and Trinity College, Cambridge. He married Elizabeth, daughter of General Sir Richard John Meade, in 1891. They had three children, one of whom was Frances Joan Dickinson, Baroness Northchurch. On 18 January 1930 he was raised to the peerage as Baron Dickinson, of Painswick in the County of Gloucester. Lord Dickinson died in May 1943, aged 84, and was succeeded in the barony by his grandson Richard, his only son the Hon. Richard Sebastian Willoughby Dickinson having predeceased him. Willoughby Dickinson's sister, Frances May, an anaesthetist, was the first wife of surgeon Sir James Berry.

Political career

He served as vice-chairman of the recently formed London County Council from 1892 to 1896 and then its chairman from March 1900 to March 1901. From 1896 until 1918, he was chair of the London Liberal Federation. He was an assiduous supporter of women's suffrage, promoting a number of measures in Parliament to get the vote for women. Dickinson was made a Privy Counsellor in 1914. He did not stand for parliament again. He was later secretary-general of the World Alliance for International Friendship, and from 1931 chairman of its International Council. In 1930, he joined the Labour Party, but the following year he was part of the National Labour Organisation split.

Electoral record

Arms

References

 Kidd, Charles, Williamson, David (editors). Debrett's Peerage and Baronetage (1990 edition). New York: St Martin's Press, 1990. .
 
 
 

1859 births
1943 deaths
People educated at Eton College
Labour Party (UK) hereditary peers
Liberal Party (UK) MPs for English constituencies
Barons in the Peerage of the United Kingdom
Members of the Privy Council of the United Kingdom
Knights Commander of the Order of the British Empire
UK MPs 1906–1910
UK MPs 1910
UK MPs 1910–1918
UK MPs who were granted peerages
Members of London County Council
Progressive Party (London) politicians
Hyett family
Barons created by George V